A Polish withdrawal from the European Union, or Polexit (a portmanteau of "Poland" and "exit"), is the name given to a hypothetical Polish withdrawal from the European Union. The term was coined after Brexit, the process of Britain's withdrawal from the EU which took place between 2016 and 2020.

History

Poland joined the European Union in 2004 through the Treaty of Accession 2003. At the time the EU included fifteen countries, mostly from Western, Northern and Southern Europe (see the Maastricht Treaty); the Treaty of Accession 2003 would accept ten more, mostly from Central and Eastern Europe, and the Baltic states.

In 2016, following continued political pressures from British Eurosceptics, Britain conducted a referendum on withdrawal from the EU. After the referendum had narrowly favored withdrawal, international media started speculating about the prospects of a similar event taking place in Poland (a so-called Polexit).

In 2019, the Supreme Court of Poland warned that the judicial reform planned by the ruling Law and Justice (PiS) party could result in Poland having to leave the EU, as it undermines the independence of the judiciary and challenges the principle of the primacy of EU law, which is a key condition for membership that Poland had signed up to in its Treaty of Accession.

On 22 November 2020, Do Rzeczy, a Polish weekly newspaper, published a front-page article called "Polexit: We have the right to talk about it".

In September 2021, Ryszard Terlecki, Deputy Marshal of the Sejm and head of the Law and Justice parliamentary caucus, said that his party '[wanted] to remain in the EU and to have a cooperative relationship', but that the EU 'should be acceptable to us'. He added that if things were to go the way they were likely to go, they would have to search for a "drastic solution", further contending that the British left the EU because "the dictatorship of the Brussels bureaucracy did not suit them". This led to some people saying Terlecki had thus called for a Polexit.

October 2021 Constitutional Tribunal ruling 

The government of Poland has been making controversial changes to the Polish judiciary, in particular as related to the Polish Constitutional Tribunal, the National Council of the Judiciary, the Supreme Court as well as its Disciplinary Chamber. These have attracted scrutiny from the European Court of Justice, which has been issuing rulings attempting to stop these changes that it sees as undermining the rule of law and judicial independence. The Tribunal's legitimacy is contested after multiple appointments of judges loyal to the ruling nationalist Law and Justice (PiS) party were made, some of which in controversial circumstances.

In March 2021, Prime Minister Mateusz Morawiecki asked the Constitutional Tribunal whether the Polish constitution is above EU regulations and EU court rulings and whether the European Court of Justice acted beyond the powers granted by the EU treaties when controlling the judicial reforms in Poland, which the government insisted was the case. 

On 7 October 2021, Poland's Constitutional Tribunal ruled that some provisions of EU treaties and EU court rulings clashed with the Constitution of Poland, asserting that EU institutions [were acting] beyond the scope of their competences; effectively rejecting the notion of primacy of EU law. BBC News and Foreign Policy reported that this risked Polexit, while the Financial Times called it "legal secession from the EU"; however, The Economist opined that Polexit is unlikely due to this court ruling, instead talking of a "dirty remain".

Public opinion
In the 2003 Polish referendum on joining the EU, 77.6% of voters voted in favor. Poland joined the EU the following year, and since then–according to regular polls conducted by the governmental Centre for Public Opinion Research (CBOS)–no more than a quarter of respondents ever supported leaving, with support gradually waning down to a mere 5% in 2019 and 6% in 2021. For more results, see the table below.

However, there is some support for conducting a second referendum on EU membership: in an October 2021 poll conducted for Rzeczpospolita, 42.6% of respondents were for, while 36.9% were against.

In response to the ruling of the Constitutional Tribunal earlier that month (mentioned above), more than 100,000 Poles took part in a 10 October 2021 demonstrations in support of  Poland's continued membership, including 80,000-100,000 protesters in Warsaw alone.

Endorsement of Polexit by political parties 
In general, Eurosceptic parties in Poland hold right-wing political views. For instance, the Confederation Liberty and Independence (Konfederacja) party has called for a withdrawal from the European Union on several occasions, and its electorate is among the most Eurosceptic on the Polish political arena, with a quarter of voters for the party endorsing Polexit, according to a November 2020 poll. Similarly, members of United Poland (Solidarna Polska), a junior coalition partner for PiS, have questioned whether the EU is appropriate for Polish interests, and the party's head, Zbigniew Ziobro, said he would not approve any constitutional change anchoring Poland in the European Union; however, they also said that if the European Union institutions get "appropriately" reformed, they might agree to stay. , which emerged on the base of the Congress of the New Right and is centered around Stanisław Żółtek, a former MEP from that party and candidate for 2020 presidential election, is also arguing for secession from the European Union. It is not currently represented in either Polish or European parliament. In 2020, Żółtek received 0,23% of votes in the presidential elections. 

Law and Justice (PiS) and Kukiz'15 are also Eurosceptic parties. Critics, including Donald Tusk (former President of the European Council and now leader of the main opposition party Civic Platform), warn that PiS's actions will eventually lead to Polexit and will jeopardise Poland's future in the EU, though Jarosław Kaczyński, its leader, and Prime Minister Mateusz Morawiecki both dismissed the allegations that PiS is preparing for it as "fake news", while Paweł Kukiz said that "no Polexit would happen because there's no possibility for the EU to expel us". Similar remarks were made by Przemysław Czarnek, the minister of education.

There are currently no left-wing, left-of-centre or centrist parties represented in parliament endorsing Polexit, and their electorate's support for withdrawal from the European Union is negligible. The somewhat conservative Polish People's Party (PSL) is also known as a pro-European political organisation.

See also
 Article 7 of the Treaty on European Union: procedure to suspend certain rights from a member state or to apply sanctions to it.

Notes

References

External links

  

Proposals in Poland
Portmanteaus
Withdrawal from the European Union
Poland and the European Union
Euroscepticism in Poland
Public policy proposals